"Colors" is a song by American singer and songwriter Jason Derulo. It was the Coca-Cola promotional anthem for the 2018 FIFA World Cup. The song was released on March 9, 2018. On April 12, 2018, Derulo performed the song live during a medley with "Tip Toe" and "Swalla" at the German Echo Music Prize. A Spanglish version with Colombian singer Maluma was released on April 13, 2018.

Background
Derulo collaborated with Coca-Cola to produce the song.

Music video
A sneak peek video for the music video of the song was released on Coca-Cola's YouTube channel on February 15, 2018. In the video, Jason Derulo is seen holding a ball which contains the label of the Coca-Cola brand, as well as a representative for a Coca-Cola campaign. The music video for the solo version of the song was released on April 11, 2018, on Derulo's Vevo account on YouTube. Two days later, the music video for the Maluma version of the single was released.

Track listing
Digital download – single
 "Colors" – 3:07
 "Colors" (with Maluma) – 3:19
 "Colors" (featuring Aseel Omran and Lil Eazy) – 3:28
 "Colors" (featuring Tamer Hosny) – 2:53
 "Colors" (featuring Douzi) – 3:10
 "Colors" (featuring Ah Moon & AR-T)  3:35

Remixes
Several remixes each titled "Colours" were released on April 20, 2018, featuring South African rapper Cassper Nyovest, Tanzanian singer Diamond Platnumz, Mozambican singer Lizha James, Ethiopian singer Sami Dan, Egyptian singer Tamer Hosny and Ugandan singer Ykee Benda. On June 18, 2018, a remix of the song was released featuring Pakistani singer Qurat-ul-Ain Balouch. Another remix was released with Maltese singer Ira Losco, to be performed at Isle of MTV Malta 2018.

Charts

Certifications

References

External links

2018 songs
2018 singles
Jason Derulo songs
Maluma songs
Songs written by Jason Derulo
2018 FIFA World Cup
FIFA World Cup songs
Macaronic songs
Songs written by Nija Charles
Songs written by Edgar Barrera
Songs written by Sermstyle
Warner Records singles